Meemu may refer to:

Meemu Atoll, an administrative division of the Maldives.
Meemu, the tenth consonant of the Thaana abugaida used in Dhivehi.